Machu Kuntur Sinqa (Quechua machu old, kuntur condor, sinqa nose, also spelled Machucóndor Senqa) or Machu Kuntur Sankha (sankha cliff, Hispanicized Machucóndor Sanga) is a mountain in the Cusco Region in Peru, about  high. It is situated in the Calca Province, on the border of the districts Pisac and San Salvador. Machu Kuntur Sinqa lies on the right bank of the Willkanuta River, near the archaeological park of Pisac.

References 

Mountains of Peru
Mountains of Cusco Region